The Mount Orne Bridge is a covered bridge over the Connecticut River between Lancaster, New Hampshire, and Lunenburg, Vermont. It joins Elm Street (New Hampshire Route 135) in South Lancaster with River Road (Town Highway 1) in Lunenburg. Built in 1911, it is one of two Howe truss bridges across the Connecticut River. It was listed on the National Register of Historic Places in 1976.

Description and history
The Mount Orne Covered Bridge is located in a rural area of eastern Lunenburg and southwestern Lancaster. It spans the Connecticut River in a roughly northwest-southeast orientation. It consists of two spans of wood-and-iron Howe trusses, resting on stone abutments and piers which have been partially faced in concrete. The bridge is covered by a corrugated metal gable roof, and is sided in vertical boarding that extends only partway to the eaves. The siding extends around to the insides of the portals.

The bridge was built in 1911 by the Berlin Construction Company, replacing one that was washed away by flooding in 1905. It is one of only two Howe truss bridges over the Connecticut River; the other, the Columbia Bridge, was built in 1912. The two bridges are among the last to be built during the historic period of covered bridge construction in either state. The costs of construction and maintenance are shared by the two towns. The most recent rededication of the bridge took place on November 23, 1983.

See also 

 List of crossings of the Connecticut River
 List of covered bridges in Vermont
 List of covered bridges in New Hampshire
 List of bridges on the National Register of Historic Places in Vermont
 List of bridges on the National Register of Historic Places in New Hampshire
 National Register of Historic Places listings in Essex County, Vermont
 National Register of Historic Places listings in Coös County, New Hampshire

References

External links 

 

1911 establishments in Vermont
1911 establishments in New Hampshire
Buildings and structures in Lunenburg, Vermont
Bridges over the Connecticut River
Covered bridges on the National Register of Historic Places in New Hampshire
Covered bridges on the National Register of Historic Places in Vermont
Bridges completed in 1911
Wooden bridges in Vermont
Wooden bridges in New Hampshire
Tourist attractions in Coös County, New Hampshire
Bridges in Coös County, New Hampshire
Bridges in Essex County, Vermont
Tourist attractions in Essex County, Vermont
National Register of Historic Places in Coös County, New Hampshire
National Register of Historic Places in Essex County, Vermont
Lancaster, New Hampshire
Road bridges on the National Register of Historic Places in New Hampshire
Road bridges on the National Register of Historic Places in Vermont
Howe truss bridges in the United States
Interstate vehicle bridges in the United States